The Iowa Valley Community School District is a rural public school district headquartered in Marengo, Iowa. The district spans areas of north-central Iowa County, including the town of Marengo, and the unincorporated area of Koszta, Iowa.

The school district is accredited by the North Central Association of Colleges and Schools and the Iowa Department of Education.

The district is a member of the South Iowa Cedar League conference.  The mascot for both schools is the Tigers, and the school colors are orange and black.

, the district shares a superintendent with the English Valleys Community School District. The previous superintendent was scheduled to retire that year so the two districts sought a new one. The district is governed by a five-member board of directors, which meets monthly.

History

Early History 
The first high school program in Marengo began in 1869, expanded to a four-year high school curriculum in 1871, and the first graduate was in 1872.
In 1902, lightning struck the school building, destroying the third floor and belfry.
The core of the current building, The Carson High School, named for the former superintendent, was built in 1925 and dedicated in 1927, though the school was still called Marengo High School.

Consolidation 
In 1958, the school district consolidated and expanded to incorporate adjacent rural areas and changed the name from Marengo to Iowa Valley (based on the adjacent Iowa River).  The name of the high school was also changed from Marengo High School to Iowa Valley High School.  In 1972, a gymnasium, band/vocal music room and two science classrooms were added to the west end of the building.

Milestones 
 1850 - first school formed and log cabin constructed for classes 
 1861 - Marengo Independent School District formed 
 1869 - 11-grade system began in Marengo 
 1871 - four-year high school curriculum began, orange and black school colors adopted 
 1892 - a scandal was reported, as the school janitor, appointed by the school board to purchase school books, disappeared after emptying his bank account.
 1903 - new high school constructed 
 1910 - first yearbook published 
 1910 - Marengo designated a normal training school, training students to become teachers
 1925 - new high school building (current school) was built, 1903 building was used for elementary school 

 1954 - junior high wing was added to the high school
 1958 - with the decline of rural, one-room schools, the area encompassing Marengo, Cono, Washington and portions of Sumner, Honey Creek and Hilton townships merged to form the Iowa Valley Community School District.
 1962 - current elementary school was constructed 
 1990 - cooperative program with Kirkwood Community College for Health Careers began

Enrollment

Schools
The district operates two schools, both in Marengo:
Iowa Valley Elementary School (K-6)

Iowa Valley Junior-Senior High School (7-12)

The administrative offices are located at the high school.

Iowa Valley Junior-Senior High School

Activities 
Students at IVHS can participate in numerous activities, including band, choir, speech, drama, FCS, FFA, Student Council, and Yearbook.

Athletics 
The Tigers compete in the South Iowa Cedar League Conference in the following sports.

Cross Country
Volleyball
Football, eight-player
Basketball (as with many schools in Iowa, Iowa Valley girls played six-on-six until 1993)
Wrestling
 9 individual State Champions 
Track and Field
 Boys' Class 2A State Champions, 1985
Golf
 Girls' Class 1A State Champions, 2018
Baseball
Softball

State Championships 
The Tigers won the 1985 State Championship in Class 2A Boys' Track and Field, winning six events (110m hurdles, long jump, 400m hurdles, 1600m run, 3200m run, and the 1600m medley relay) with five athletes.

The Tigers won the 2018 State Championship in Class 1A Girls' Golf

Notable alumni 
 Del Miller, class of 1968, is a college football coach, formerly head coach at Missouri State
 Rick Wanamaker -  1971 Pan American Games decathlon gold medalist
 Travis Fiser, American high school wrestling coach, former collegiate wrestler and a member of the National Wrestling Hall of Fame.
 Jarrod Uthoff, professional basketball player, attended Iowa Valley schools through 8th grade.

See also
List of school districts in Iowa
List of high schools in Iowa

References

External links
 Iowa Valley Community School District official site

School districts in Iowa
Education in Iowa County, Iowa
1958 establishments in Iowa
School districts established in 1958